The men's pole vault event at the 1973 Summer Universiade was held at the Central Lenin Stadium in Moscow on 16 and 17 August.

Medalists

Results

Qualification

Final

References

Athletics at the 1973 Summer Universiade
1973